Imsouane is a small town and rural commune in Agadir-Ida Ou Tanane Prefecture, Souss-Massa, Morocco. At the time of the 2004 census, the commune had a total population of 9353 people living in 1704 households.

Touristic activities 
Imsouane is the favorite destination for many tourists, this is due to its breathtaking scenes as well as the calmness, tranquility and perfect waves for surfing.

Imsouane is growing in popularity every year with more hostels, restaurants and surf shops opening all the time.  The village still retains its laidback and authentic charm - which some visitors liken to the Taghazout in the 60's and 70's.

Surfing 
There are two main spots for surfing in Imsouane: 

 La Cathedrale, a beach break spot 
 La Bay, a point break spot.

Infrastructure

Public transportation 
Because of its remote location, there are limited choices available when travelling to Imsouane.  There are no public buses so the options are: hiring a car and self-driving, catching a taxi (about 800-1200dh from Agadir or Essaouira), or riding the Souk to Surf shuttle bus. The shuttle runs to Imsouane from Taghazout, Tamraght, Essaouira, Agadir daily  and costs 80dh per person.

Port 
Imsouane town is also known for its small port where vendors and locals can buy fresh fish straight from the sea.

See also 

 Bay of Imsouane

References

Populated places in Agadir-Ida Ou Tanane Prefecture
Rural communes of Souss-Massa